Ursula Wyss (born 8 February 1973 in Davos) is a Swiss politician and economist. She represented the Canton of Bern in the Swiss National Council as member of the Social Democratic Party of Switzerland (SP) from 6 December 1999 to 3 March 2013.

Early life and education 
Born and raised in the municipality of Davos in the Canton of Graubünden, Ursula Wyss is citizen of the Bernese municipalities of Buchholterberg and Köniz. In 1992 she attended higher education entrance qualification (Maturität), and started to study political economy and ecology at the University of Bern, at the University of Strathclyde in Glasgow, and at the Technical University of Berlin. Back in Bern, she graduated in 1997, worked as science assistant at the Institut für Volkswirtschaftslehre of the Bern University from 2001 to 2005 where she earned a master's degree as Dr. rer. oec. in 2006. Besides, Wyss worked at the privately financed BASS research institute and at the national WWF Switzerland bureau.

Political career 
Ursula Wyss became a member of the Social Democratic Party (SP) which she represented from 1997 to 1999 as member of the parliament (Grosser Rat des Kantons Bern) of the Canton of Bern. Between December 1999 and March 2013, she was member (Nationalrätin) of the Swiss National Council. In 2013 Wyss was elected as successor of Regula Rytz as executive member (Gemeinderätin) of the city of Bern. She presides the department Tiefbau, Verkehr und Stadtgrün that provides the municipal civil engineering, transport and the urban green areas.

Personal life 
Ursula Wyss lives in Bern and is mother of two sons.

References

External links

  
 Ursula Wyss on the website of the city of Bern 
 

Members of the National Council (Switzerland)
Swiss economists
1973 births
Living people
Political economists
Swiss women economists
Women members of the National Council (Switzerland)
University of Bern alumni
Alumni of the University of Strathclyde
Technical University of Berlin alumni
Social Democratic Party of Switzerland politicians
People from Bern
People from Davos
20th-century Swiss women politicians
21st-century Swiss women politicians
20th-century Swiss politicians
21st-century Swiss politicians
Women political scientists